Antipsychotics, also known as neuroleptics, are a class of psychotropic medication primarily used to manage psychosis (including delusions, hallucinations, paranoia or disordered thought), principally in schizophrenia but also in a range of other psychotic disorders. They are also the mainstay together with mood stabilizers in the treatment of bipolar disorder.

 
Prior research has shown that use of any antipsychotic is associated with smaller brain tissue volumes, including white matter reduction and that this brain shrinkage is dose dependent and time dependent. A more recent controlled trial suggests that second generation antipsychotics combined with intensive psychosocial therapy may potentially prevent pallidal brain volume loss in first episode psychosis.

 
The use of antipsychotics may result in many unwanted side effects such as involuntary movement disorders, gynecomastia, impotence, weight gain and metabolic syndrome. Long-term use can produce adverse effects such as tardive dyskinesia, tardive dystonia, and tardive akathisia.

Prevention of these adverse effects is possible through concomitant medication strategies including use of beta-blockers. Currently, treatments for tardive diseases are not well established.

First-generation antipsychotics (e.g. chlorpromazine), known as typical antipsychotics, were first introduced in the 1950s, and others were developed until the early 1970s. Second-generation antipsychotics, known as atypical antipsychotics, were introduced firstly with clozapine in the early 1970s followed by others (e.g. risperidone). Both generations of medication block receptors in the brain for dopamine, but atypicals tend to act on serotonin receptors as well.

Medical uses
Antipsychotics are most frequently used for the following conditions:
 Schizophrenia
 Schizoaffective disorder most commonly in conjunction with either an antidepressant (in the case of the depressive subtype) or a mood stabiliser (in the case of the bipolar subtype). 
 Bipolar disorder (acute mania and mixed episodes) may be treated with either typical or atypical antipsychotics, although atypical antipsychotics are usually preferred because they tend to have more favourable adverse effect profiles and, according to a recent meta-analysis, they tend to have a lower liability for causing conversion from mania to depression.
 Psychotic depression. In this indication it is a common practice for the psychiatrist to prescribe a combination of an atypical antipsychotic and an antidepressant as this practice is best supported by the evidence.
 Treatment resistant depression as an adjunct to standard antidepressant therapy.

Antipsychotics are generally not recommended for treating behavioral problems associated with dementia, given that the risk of use tends to be greater than the potential benefit. The same can be said for insomnia, in which they are not recommended as first-line therapy. There are evidence-based indications for using antipsychotics in children (e.g. tic disorder, bipolar disorder, psychosis), but the use of antipsychotics outside of those contexts (e.g. to treat behavioral problems) warrants significant caution.

Antipsychotics are used to treat tics associated with Tourette syndrome. Aripiprazole, an atypical antipsychotic, is used as add-on medication to ameliorate sexual dysfunction as a symptom of Selective serotonin reuptake inhibitor antidepressants in women. Quetiapine is used to treat generalized anxiety disorder.

Schizophrenia

Antipsychotic drug treatment is a key component of schizophrenia treatment recommendations by the National Institute of Health and Care Excellence (NICE), the American Psychiatric Association, and the British Society for Psychopharmacology. The main aim of treatment with antipsychotics is to reduce the positive symptoms of psychosis that include delusions and hallucinations. There is mixed evidence to support a significant impact of antipsychotic use on primary negative symptoms (such as apathy, lack of emotional affect, and lack of interest in social interactions) or on the cognitive symptoms (memory impairments, reduced ability to plan and execute tasks). In general, the efficacy of antipsychotic treatment in reducing positive symptoms appears to increase with increasing severity of baseline symptoms. All antipsychotic medications work relatively the same way, by antagonizing D2 dopamine receptors. However, there are some differences when it comes to typical and atypical antipsychotics. For example, atypical antipsychotic medications have been seen to lower the neurocognitive impairment associated with schizophrenia more so than conventional antipsychotics, although the reasoning and mechanics of this are still unclear to researchers.

Applications of antipsychotic drugs in the treatment of schizophrenia include prophylaxis in those showing symptoms that suggest that they are at high risk of developing psychosis, treatment of first episode psychosis, maintenance therapy (a form of prophylaxis, maintenance therapy aims to maintain therapeutic benefit and prevent symptom relapse), and treatment of recurrent episodes of acute psychosis.

Prevention of psychosis and symptom improvement
Test batteries such as the PACE (Personal Assessment and Crisis Evaluation Clinic) and COPS (Criteria of Prodromal Syndromes), which measure low-level psychotic symptoms and cognitive disturbances, are used to evaluate people with early, low-level symptoms of psychosis. Test results are combined with family history information to identify patients in the "high-risk" group; they are considered to have a 20–40% risk of progression to frank psychosis within two years. These patients are often treated with low doses of antipsychotic drugs with the goal of reducing their symptoms and preventing progression to frank psychosis. While generally useful for reducing symptoms, clinical trials to date show little evidence that early use of antipsychotics improves long-term outcomes in those with prodromal symptoms, either alone or in combination with cognitive-behavioral therapy.

First episode psychosis
First episode psychosis (FEP) is the first time that psychotic symptoms are presented. NICE recommends that all persons presenting with first episode psychosis be treated with both an antipsychotic drug, and cognitive behavioral therapy (CBT). NICE further recommends that those expressing a preference for CBT alone are informed that combination treatment is more effective. A diagnosis of schizophrenia is not made at this time as it takes longer to determine by both DSM-5 and ICD-11, and only around 60% of those presenting with a first episode psychosis will later be diagnosed with schizophrenia.

The conversion rate for a first episode drug induced psychosis to bipolar disorder or schizophrenia are lower, with 30% of people converting to either bipolar disorder or schizophrenia. NICE makes no distinction between a substance-induced psychosis, and any other form of psychosis. The rate of conversion differs for different classes of drug.

Pharmacological options for the specific treatment of FEP have been discussed in recent reviews. The goals of treatment for FEP include reducing symptoms and potentially improving long-term treatment outcomes. Randomized clinical trials have provided evidence for the efficacy of antipsychotic drugs in achieving the former goal, with first-generation and second generation antipsychotics showing about equal efficacy. Evidence that early treatment has a favorable effect on long term outcomes is equivocal.

Recurrent psychotic episodes
Placebo-controlled trials of both first and second generation antipsychotic drugs consistently demonstrate the superiority of active drug to placebo in suppressing psychotic symptoms. A large meta-analysis of 38 trials of antipsychotic drugs in schizophrenia acute psychotic episodes showed an effect size of about 0.5. There is little or no difference in efficacy among approved antipsychotic drugs, including both first- and second-generation agents. The efficacy of such drugs is suboptimal. Few patients achieve complete resolution of symptoms. Response rates, calculated using various cutoff values for symptom reduction, are low and their interpretation is complicated by high placebo response rates and selective publication of clinical trial results.

Maintenance therapy
The majority of patients treated with an antipsychotic drug will experience a response within four weeks. The goals of continuing treatment are to maintain suppression of symptoms, prevent relapse, improve quality of life, and support engagement in psychosocial therapy.

Maintenance therapy with antipsychotic drugs is clearly superior to placebo in preventing relapse but is associated with weight gain, movement disorders, and high dropout rates. A 3-year trial following persons receiving maintenance therapy after an acute psychotic episode found that 33% obtained long-lasting symptom reduction, 13% achieved remission, and only 27% experienced satisfactory quality of life. The effect of relapse prevention on long term outcomes is uncertain, as historical studies show little difference in long term outcomes before and after the introduction of antipsychotic drugs.

While maintenance therapy clearly reduces the rate of relapses requiring hospitalization, a large observational study in Finland found that, in people that eventually discontinued antipsychotics, the risk of being hospitalized again for a mental health problem or dying increased the longer they were dispensed (and presumably took) antipsychotics prior to stopping therapy. If people did not stop taking antipsychotics, they remained at low risk for relapse and hospitalization compared to those that stopped taking antipsychotics. The authors speculated that the difference may be because the people that discontinued treatment after a longer time had more severe mental illness than those that discontinued antipsychotic therapy sooner.

A significant challenge in the use of antipsychotic drugs for the prevention of relapse is the poor rate of adherence. In spite of the relatively high rates of adverse effects associated with these drugs, some evidence, including higher dropout rates in placebo arms compared to treatment arms in randomized clinical trials, suggest that most patients who discontinue treatment do so because of suboptimal efficacy. If someone experiences psychotic symptoms due to nonadherence, they may be compelled to treatment through a process called involuntary commitment, in which they can be forced to accept treatment (including antipsychotics). A person can also be committed to treatment outside of a hospital, called outpatient commitment.

Antipsychotics in long-acting injectable (LAI), or "depot", form have been suggested as a method of decreasing medication nonadherence (sometimes also called non-compliance). NICE advises LAIs be offered to patients when preventing covert, intentional nonadherence is a clinical priority. LAIs are used to ensure adherence in outpatient commitment. A meta-analysis found that LAIs resulted in lower rates of rehospitalization with a hazard ratio of 0.83, however these results were not statistically significant (the 95% confidence interval was 0.62 to 1.11).

Bipolar disorder

Antipsychotics are routinely used, often in conjunction with mood stabilisers such as lithium/valproate, as a first-line treatment for manic and mixed episodes associated with bipolar disorder. The reason for this combination is the therapeutic delay of the aforementioned mood stabilisers (for valproate therapeutic effects are usually seen around five days after treatment is commenced whereas lithium usually takes at least a week before the full therapeutic effects are seen) and the comparatively rapid antimanic effects of antipsychotic drugs. The antipsychotics have a documented efficacy when used alone in acute mania/mixed episodes.

At least five atypical antipsychotics (lumateperone, cariprazine, lurasidone, olanzapine, and quetiapine) have also been found to possess efficacy in the treatment of bipolar depression as a monotherapy, whereas only olanzapine and quetiapine have been proven to be effective broad-spectrum (i.e. against all three types of relapse—manic, mixed and depressive) prophylactic (or maintenance) treatments in patients with bipolar disorder. A recent Cochrane review also found that olanzapine had a less favourable risk/benefit ratio than lithium as a maintenance treatment for bipolar disorder.

The American Psychiatric Association and the UK National Institute for Health and Care Excellence recommend antipsychotics for managing acute psychotic episodes in schizophrenia or bipolar disorder, and as a longer-term maintenance treatment for reducing the likelihood of further episodes. They state that response to any given antipsychotic can be variable so that trials may be necessary, and that lower doses are to be preferred where possible. A number of studies have looked at levels of "compliance" or "adherence" with antipsychotic regimes and found that discontinuation (stopping taking them) by patients is associated with higher rates of relapse, including hospitalization.

Dementia
Psychosis and agitation develop in as many as 80 percent of people living in nursing homes. Despite a lack of FDA approval and black-box warnings, atypical antipsychotics are very often prescribed to people with dementia. An assessment for an underlying cause of behavior is needed before prescribing antipsychotic medication for symptoms of dementia. Antipsychotics in old age dementia showed a modest benefit compared to placebo in managing aggression or psychosis, but this is combined with a fairly large increase in serious adverse events. Thus, antipsychotics should not be used routinely to treat dementia with aggression or psychosis, but may be an option in a few cases where there is severe distress or risk of physical harm to others. Psychosocial interventions may reduce the need for antipsychotics. In 2005, the FDA issued an advisory warning of an increased risk of death when atypical antipsychotics are used in dementia. In the subsequent 5 years, the use of atypical antipsychotics to treat dementia decreased by nearly 50%.

Major depressive disorder
A number of atypical antipsychotics have some benefits when used in addition to other treatments in major depressive disorder. Aripiprazole, quetiapine extended-release, and olanzapine (when used in conjunction with fluoxetine) have received the Food and Drug Administration (FDA) labelling for this indication. There is, however, a greater risk of side effects with their use compared to using traditional antidepressants. The greater risk of serious side effects with antipsychotics is why, e.g., quetiapine was denied approval as monotherapy for major depressive disorder or generalized anxiety disorder, and instead was only approved as an adjunctive treatment in combination with traditional antidepressants.

Other
Besides the above uses antipsychotics may be used for obsessive–compulsive disorder, post-traumatic stress disorder, personality disorders, Tourette syndrome, autism and agitation in those with dementia. Evidence however does not support the use of atypical antipsychotics in eating disorders or personality disorder. The atypical antipsychotic risperidone may be useful for obsessive–compulsive disorder. The use of low doses of antipsychotics for insomnia, while common, is not recommended as there is little evidence of benefit as well as concern regarding adverse effects. Some of the more serious adverse effects may also occur at the low doses used, such as dyslipidemia and neutropenia, and a recent network meta-analysis of 154 double-blind, randomized controlled trials of drug therapies vs. placebo for insomnia in adults found that quetiapine did not demonstrated any short-term benefits in sleep quality. Low dose antipsychotics may also be used in treatment of impulse-behavioural and cognitive-perceptual symptoms of borderline personality disorder. Despite the lack of evidence supporting the benefit of antipsychotics in people with personality disorders, 1 in 4 who do not have a serious mental illness are prescribed them in UK primary care. Many people receive these medication for over a year, contrary to NICE guidelines.

In children they may be used in those with disruptive behavior disorders, mood disorders and pervasive developmental disorders or intellectual disability. Antipsychotics are only weakly recommended for Tourette syndrome, because although they are effective, side effects are common. The situation is similar for those on the autism spectrum.
Much of the evidence for the off-label use of antipsychotics (for example, for dementia, OCD, PTSD, Personality Disorders, Tourette's) was of insufficient scientific quality to support such use, especially as there was strong evidence of increased risks of stroke, tremors, significant weight gain, sedation, and gastrointestinal problems. A UK review of unlicensed usage in children and adolescents reported a similar mixture of findings and concerns. A survey of children with pervasive developmental disorder found that 16.5% were taking an antipsychotic drug, most commonly for irritability, aggression, and agitation. Both risperidone and aripiprazole have been approved by the US FDA for the treatment of irritability in autistic children and adolescents.

Aggressive challenging behavior in adults with intellectual disability is often treated with antipsychotic drugs despite lack of an evidence base. A recent randomized controlled trial, however, found no benefit over placebo and recommended that the use of antipsychotics in this way should no longer be regarded as an acceptable routine treatment.

Antipsychotics may be an option, together with stimulants, in people with ADHD and aggressive behavior when other treatments have not worked. They have not been found to be useful for the prevention of delirium among those admitted to hospital.

Typicals vs atypicals
It is unclear whether the atypical (second-generation) antipsychotics offer advantages over older, first generation antipsychotics. Amisulpride, olanzapine, risperidone and clozapine may be more effective but are associated with greater side effects. Typical antipsychotics have equal drop-out and symptom relapse rates to atypicals when used at low to moderate dosages.

Clozapine is an effective treatment for those who respond poorly to other drugs ("treatment-resistant" or "refractory" schizophrenia), but it has the potentially serious side effect of agranulocytosis (lowered white blood cell count) in less than 4% of people.

Due to bias in the research the accuracy of comparisons of atypical antipsychotics is a concern.

In 2005, a US government body, the National Institute of Mental Health published the results of a major independent study (the CATIE project). No other atypical studied (risperidone, quetiapine, and ziprasidone) did better than the typical perphenazine on the measures used, nor did they produce fewer adverse effects than the typical antipsychotic perphenazine, although more patients discontinued perphenazine owing to extrapyramidal effects compared to the atypical agents (8% vs. 2% to 4%).

Atypical antipsychotics do not appear to lead to improved rates of medication adherence compared to typical antipsychotics.

Many researchers question the first-line prescribing of atypicals over typicals, and some even question the distinction between the two classes. In contrast, other researchers point to the significantly higher risk of tardive dyskinesia and other extrapyramidal symptoms with the typicals and for this reason alone recommend first-line treatment with the atypicals, notwithstanding a greater propensity for metabolic adverse effects in the latter. The UK government organization NICE recently revised its recommendation favoring atypicals, to advise that the choice should be an individual one based on the particular profiles of the individual drug and on the patient's preferences.

The re-evaluation of the evidence has not necessarily slowed the bias toward prescribing the atypicals.

Adverse effects

Generally, more than one antipsychotic drug should not be used at a time because of increased adverse effects.

Some atypicals are associated with considerable weight gain, diabetes and the risk of metabolic syndrome. Unwanted side effects cause people to stop treatment, resulting in relapses.
Risperidone (atypical) has a similar rate of extrapyramidal symptoms to haloperidol (typical). A rare but potentially lethal condition of neuroleptic malignant syndrome (NMS) has been associated with the use of antipsychotics. Through its early recognition, and timely intervention rates have declined. However, an awareness of the syndrome is advised to enable intervention. Another less rare condition of tardive dyskinesia can occur due to long-term use of antipsychotics, developing after months or years of use. It is more often reported with use of typical antipsychotics. Very rarely antipsychotics may cause tardive psychosis.

Clozapine is associated with side effects that include weight gain, tiredness, and hypersalivation. More serious adverse effects include seizures, NMS, neutropenia, and agranulocytosis (lowered white blood cell count) and its use needs careful monitoring.

Clozapine is also associated with thromboembolism (including pulmonary embolism), myocarditis, and cardiomyopathy. A systematic review of clozapine-associated pulmonary embolism indicates that this adverse effect can often be fatal, and that it has an early onset, and is dose-dependent. The findings advised the consideration of using a prevention therapy for venous thromboembolism after starting treatment with clozapine, and continuing this for six months. Constipation is three times more likely to occur with the use of clozapine, and severe cases can lead to ileus and bowel ischemia resulting in many fatalities. Very rare clozapine adverse effects include  periorbital edema due to several possible mechanisms (e.g. inhibition of platelet-derived growth factor receptors leading to increased vascular permeability, antagonism of renal dopamine receptors with electrolyte and fluid imbalance and immune-mediated hypersensitivity reactions).

However, the risk of serious adverse effects from clozapine is low, and there are the beneficial effects to be gained of a reduced risk of suicide, and aggression. Typical antipsychotics and atypical risperidone can have a side effect of sexual dysfunction. Clozapine, olanzapine, and quetiapine are associated with beneficial effects on sexual functioning helped by various psychotherapies.

By rate
Common (≥ 1% and up to 50% incidence for most antipsychotic drugs) adverse effects of antipsychotics include:
 Sedation (particularly common with asenapine, clozapine, olanzapine, quetiapine, chlorpromazine and zotepine)
 Headaches
 Dizziness
 Diarrhea
 Anxiety
 Extrapyramidal side effects (particularly common with first-generation antipsychotics), which include:
- Akathisia, an often distressing sense of inner restlessness.
- Dystonia, an abnormal muscle contraction
- Pseudoparkinsonism, symptoms that are similar to what people with Parkinson's disease experience, including tremulousness and drooling
 Hyperprolactinaemia (rare for those treated with clozapine, quetiapine and aripiprazole), which can cause:
- Galactorrhoea, the unusual secretion of breast milk.
- Gynaecomastia, abnormal growth of breast tissue
- Sexual dysfunction (in both sexes)
- Osteoporosis
 Orthostatic hypotension
 Weight gain (particularly prominent with clozapine, olanzapine, quetiapine and zotepine)
 Anticholinergic side-effects (common for olanzapine, clozapine; less likely on risperidone) such as:
- Blurred vision
- Constipation
- Dry mouth (although hypersalivation may also occur)
- Reduced perspiration
 Tardive dyskinesia appears to be more frequent with high-potency first-generation antipsychotics, such as haloperidol, and tends to appear after chronic and not acute treatment. It is characterized by slow (hence the tardive) repetitive, involuntary and purposeless movements, most often of the face, lips, legs, or torso, which tend to resist treatment and are frequently irreversible. The rate of appearance of TD is about 5% per year of use of antipsychotic drug (whatever the drug used)
 breast cancer: a systematic review and meta-analysis of observational studies with over 2 million individuals estimated an association between antipsychotic use and breast cancer by over 30%.

Rare/Uncommon (<1% incidence for most antipsychotic drugs) adverse effects of antipsychotics include:
 Blood dyscrasias (e.g., agranulocytosis, leukopenia, and neutropaenia), which is more common in patients on clozapine. 
 Metabolic syndrome and other metabolic problems such as type II diabetes mellitus — particularly common with clozapine, olanzapine and zotepine. In American studies African Americans appeared to be at a heightened risk for developing type II diabetes mellitus. Evidence suggests that females are more sensitive to the metabolic side effects of first-generation antipsychotic drugs than males. Metabolic adverse effects appear to be mediated by the following mechanisms:
- Causing weight gain by antagonizing the histamine H1 and serotonin 5-HT2Creceptors and perhaps by interacting with other neurochemical pathways in the central nervous system.
 Neuroleptic malignant syndrome, a potentially fatal condition characterized by:
- Autonomic instability, which can manifest with tachycardia, nausea, vomiting, diaphoresis, etc.
- Hyperthermia — elevated body temperature.
- Mental status change (confusion, hallucinations, coma, etc.)
- Muscle rigidity
- Laboratory abnormalities (e.g., elevated creatine kinase, reduced iron plasma levels, electrolyte abnormalities, etc.)
 Pancreatitis
 QT interval prolongation — more prominent in those treated with amisulpride, pimozide, sertindole, thioridazine and ziprasidone.
 Torsades de pointes
 Seizures, particularly in people treated with chlorpromazine and clozapine. 
 Thromboembolism
 Myocardial infarction
 Stroke

Long-term effects

Some studies have found decreased life expectancy associated with the use of antipsychotics, and argued that more studies are needed. Antipsychotics may also increase the risk of early death in individuals with dementia. Antipsychotics typically worsen symptoms in people with depersonalisation disorder. Antipsychotic polypharmacy (prescribing two or more antipsychotics at the same time for an individual) is a common practice but not evidence-based or recommended, and there are initiatives to curtail it. Similarly, the use of excessively high doses (often the result of polypharmacy) continues despite clinical guidelines and evidence indicating that it is usually no more effective but is usually more harmful. A meta-analysis of observational studies with over two million individuals has suggested a moderate association of antipsychotic use with breast cancer.

Loss of grey matter and other brain structural changes over time are observed amongst people diagnosed with schizophrenia. Meta-analyses of the effects of antipsychotic treatment on grey matter volume and the brain's structure have reached conflicting conclusions. A 2012 meta-analysis concluded that grey matter loss is greater in patients treated with first generation antipsychotics relative to those treated with atypicals, and hypothesized a protective effect of atypicals as one possible explanation. A second meta-analysis suggested that treatment with antipsychotics was associated with increased grey matter loss. Animal studies found that monkeys exposed to both first- and second-generation antipsychotics experience significant reduction in brain volume, resulting in an 8-11% reduction in brain volume over a 17–27 month period.

The National Association of State Mental Health Program Directors said that antipsychotics are not interchangeable and it is recommend including trying at least one weight-neutral treatment for those patients with potential metabolic issues.

Subtle, long-lasting forms of akathisia are often overlooked or confused with post-psychotic depression, in particular when they lack the extrapyramidal aspect that psychiatrists have been taught to expect when looking for signs of akathisia.

Adverse effect on cognitive function and increased risk of death in people with dementia along with worsening of symptoms has been described in the literature.

Discontinuation

The British National Formulary recommends a gradual withdrawal when discontinuing antipsychotics to avoid acute withdrawal syndrome or rapid relapse. Symptoms of withdrawal commonly include nausea, vomiting, and loss of appetite. Other symptoms may include restlessness, increased sweating, and trouble sleeping. Less commonly there may be a feeling of the world spinning, numbness, or muscle pains. Symptoms generally resolve after a short period of time.

There is tentative evidence that discontinuation of antipsychotics can result in psychosis. It may also result in recurrence of the condition that is being treated. Rarely tardive dyskinesia can occur when the medication is stopped.

Unexpected psychotic episodes have been observed in patients withdrawing from clozapine. This is referred to as supersensitivity psychosis, not to be equated with tardive dyskinesia.

Tardive dyskinesia may abate during withdrawal from the antipsychotic agent, or it may persist.

Withdrawal effects may also occur when switching a person from one antipsychotic to another, (it is presumed due to variations of potency and receptor activity). Such withdrawal effects can include cholinergic rebound, an activation syndrome, and motor syndromes including dyskinesias. These adverse effects are more likely during rapid changes between antipsychotic agents, so making a gradual change between antipsychotics minimises these withdrawal effects. The British National Formulary recommends a gradual withdrawal when discontinuing antipsychotic treatment to avoid acute withdrawal syndrome or rapid relapse. The process of cross-titration involves gradually increasing the dose of the new medication while gradually decreasing the dose of the old medication.

City and Hackney Clinical Commissioning Group found more than 1,000 patients in their area in July 2019 who had not had regular medication reviews or health checks because they were not registered as having serious mental illness. On average they had been taking these drugs for six years.  If this is typical of practice in England more than 100,000 patients are probably in the same position.

List of agents 

Clinically used antipsychotic medications are listed below by drug group. Trade names appear in parentheses. A 2013 review has stated that the division of antipsychotics into first and second generation is perhaps not accurate.

Notes:

† indicates drugs that are no longer (or were never) marketed in English-speaking countries. 

‡ denotes drugs that are no longer (or were never to begin with) marketed in the United States. Some antipsychotics are not firmly placed in either first-generation or second-generation classes.

# denotes drugs that have been withdrawn worldwide.

First-generation (typical)

Butyrophenones

 Benperidol‡
 Bromperidol†
 Droperidol‡
 Haloperidol
 Moperone (discontinued)†
 Pipamperone (discontinued)†
 Timiperone †

Diphenylbutylpiperidines
 Fluspirilene ‡ 
 Penfluridol ‡ 
 Pimozide

Phenothiazines

 Acepromazine † — although it is mostly used in veterinary medicine. 
 Chlorpromazine
 Cyamemazine †
 Dixyrazine †
 Fluphenazine
 Levomepromazine‡
 Mesoridazine (discontinued)†
 Perazine 
 Pericyazine‡
 Perphenazine 
 Pipotiazine ‡
 Prochlorperazine 
 Promazine (discontinued)
 Promethazine 
 Prothipendyl †
 Thioproperazine‡ (only English-speaking country it is available in is Canada)
 Thioridazine (discontinued)
 Trifluoperazine 
 Triflupromazine (discontinued)†

Thioxanthenes

 Chlorprothixene †
 Clopenthixol 
 Flupentixol ‡
 Thiothixene 
 Zuclopenthixol ‡

Disputed/unknown
This category is for drugs that have been called both first and second-generation, depending on the literature being used.

Benzamides
 Sulpiride ‡
 Sultopride †
 Veralipride †

Tricyclics
 Carpipramine †
 Clocapramine †
 Clorotepine †
 Clotiapine ‡
 Loxapine 
 Mosapramine †

Others
 Molindone #

Second-generation (atypical)

Benzamides
 Amisulpride ‡ – Selective dopamine antagonist. Higher doses (greater than 400 mg) act upon post-synaptic dopamine receptors resulting in a reduction in the positive symptoms of schizophrenia, such as psychosis. Lower doses, however, act upon dopamine autoreceptors, resulting in increased dopamine transmission, improving the negative symptoms of schizophrenia. Lower doses of amisulpride have also been shown to have antidepressant and anxiolytic effects in non-schizophrenic patients, leading to its use in dysthymia and social phobias.
 Nemonapride † – Used in Japan.
 Remoxipride # – Has a risk of causing aplastic anaemia and, hence, has been withdrawn from the market worldwide. It has also been found to possess relatively low (virtually absent) potential to induce hyperprolactinaemia and extrapyramidal symptoms, likely attributable to its comparatively weak binding to (and, hence, rapid dissociation from) the D2 receptor.
 Sultopride – An atypical antipsychotic of the benzamide chemical class used in Europe, Japan, and Hong Kong for the treatment of schizophrenia. It was launched by Sanofi-Aventis in 1976. Sultopride acts as a selective D2 and D3 receptor antagonist.

Benzisoxazoles/benzisothiazoles

 Lumateperone –  In December 2019, lumateperone received its first global approval in the USA for the treatment of schizophrenia in adults. In 2020 and 2021 FDA approved for depressive episodes associated with bipolar I or II disorder (bipolar depression) in adults, as monotherapy and as adjunctive therapy with lithium or valproate.

 Iloperidone – Approved by the US FDA in 2009, it is fairly well tolerated, although hypotension, dizziness, and somnolence were very common side effects. Has not received regulatory approval in other countries, however.
 Paliperidone – Primary, active metabolite of risperidone that was approved in 2006.
 Perospirone † – Has a higher incidence of extrapyramidal side effects than other atypical antipsychotics.
 Risperidone – Divided dosing is recommended until initial titration is completed, at which time the drug can be administered once daily. Used off-label to treat Tourette syndrome and anxiety disorder.
 Ziprasidone – Approved in 2004 to treat bipolar disorder. Side-effects include a prolonged QT interval in the heart, which can be dangerous for patients with heart disease or those taking other drugs that prolong the QT interval.

Butyrophenones
 Melperone † – Only used in a few European countries. No English-speaking country has licensed it to date.
 Lumateperone

Tricyclics
 Asenapine – Used for the treatment of schizophrenia and acute mania associated with bipolar disorder.
 Clozapine – Requires routine laboratory monitoring of complete blood counts every one to four weeks due to the risk of agranulocytosis. It has unparalleled efficacy in the treatment of treatment-resistant schizophrenia.
 Olanzapine – Used to treat psychotic disorders including schizophrenia, acute manic episodes, and maintenance of bipolar disorder. Used as an adjunct to antidepressant therapy, either alone or in combination with fluoxetine as Symbyax.
 Quetiapine – Used primarily to treat bipolar disorder and schizophrenia. Also used and licensed in a few countries (including Australia, the United Kingdom and the United States) as an adjunct to antidepressant therapy in patients with major depressive disorder. It's the only antipsychotic that's demonstrated efficacy as a monotherapy for the treatment of major depressive disorder. It indirectly serves as a norepinephrine reuptake inhibitor by means of its active metabolite, norquetiapine.
 Zotepine – An atypical antipsychotic indicated for acute and chronic schizophrenia. It is still used in Japan and was once used in Germany but it was discontinued.†

Others
 Blonanserin – Approved by the PMDA in 2008. Used in Japan and South Korea.
 Pimavanserin – A selective 5-HT2A receptor antagonist approved for the treatment of Parkinson's disease psychosis in 2016.
 Sertindole ‡ – Developed by the Danish pharmaceutical company H. Lundbeck. Like the other atypical antipsychotics, it is believed to have antagonist activity at dopamine and serotonin receptors in the brain.

Third-generation
Third generation antipsychotics are recognized as demonstrating D2 receptor agonism as opposed to the D2 receptor antagonistic mechanism of both first-generation (typical) and second-generation (atypical) antipsychotic medications.

Phenylpiperazines/quinolinones 

Aripiprazole (Abilify) – Partial agonist at the D2 receptor. Considered the prototypical third-generation antipsychotic.
 Aripiprazole lauroxil (Abilify Maintena)– Long-acting version of aripiprazole for injection.
 Brexpiprazole – Partial agonist of the D2 receptor. Successor of aripiprazole.
 Cariprazine – A D3-preferring D2/D3 partial agonist.

Benzisoxazoles/benzisothiazoles 

 Lurasidone (Latuda) – Approved by the US FDA for schizophrenia and bipolar depression, and for use as schizophrenia treatment in Canada.

Mechanism of action
Antipsychotic drugs such as haloperidol and chlorpromazine tend to block dopamine D2 receptors in the dopaminergic pathways of the brain. This means that dopamine released in these pathways has less effect. Excess release of dopamine in the mesolimbic pathway has been linked to psychotic experiences. Decreased dopamine release in the prefrontal cortex, and excess dopamine release in other pathways, are associated with psychotic episodes in schizophrenia and bipolar disorder.

In addition to the antagonistic effects of dopamine, antipsychotics (in particular atypical neuroleptics) also antagonize 5-HT2A receptors. Different alleles of the 5-HT2A receptor have been associated with schizophrenia and other psychoses, including depression. Higher concentrations of 5-HT2A receptors in cortical and subcortical areas, in particular in the right caudate nucleus have been historically recorded.

Typical antipsychotics are not particularly selective and also block dopamine receptors in the mesocortical pathway, tuberoinfundibular pathway, and the nigrostriatal pathway. Blocking D2 receptors in these other pathways is thought to produce some unwanted side effects that the typical antipsychotics can produce (see above). They were commonly classified on a spectrum of low potency to high potency, where potency referred to the ability of the drug to bind to dopamine receptors, and not to the effectiveness of the drug. High-potency antipsychotics such as haloperidol, in general, have doses of a few milligrams and cause less sleepiness and calming effects than low-potency antipsychotics such as chlorpromazine and thioridazine, which have dosages of several hundred milligrams. The latter have a greater degree of anticholinergic and antihistaminergic activity, which can counteract dopamine-related side-effects.

Atypical antipsychotic drugs have a similar blocking effect on D2 receptors; however, most also act on serotonin receptors, especially 5-HT2A and 5-HT2C receptors. Both clozapine and quetiapine appear to bind just long enough to elicit antipsychotic effects but not long enough to induce extrapyramidal side effects and prolactin hypersecretion. 5-HT2A antagonism increases dopaminergic activity in the nigrostriatal pathway, leading to a lowered extrapyramidal side effect liability among the atypical antipsychotics.

Comparison of medications

History

The original antipsychotic drugs were happened upon largely by chance and then tested for their effectiveness. The first, chlorpromazine, was developed as a surgical anesthetic. It was first used on psychiatric patients because of its powerful calming effect; at the time it was regarded as a non-permanent "pharmacological lobotomy". Lobotomy at the time was used to treat many behavioral disorders, including psychosis, although its effect was to markedly reduce behavior and mental functioning of all types. However, chlorpromazine proved to reduce the effects of psychosis in a more effective and specific manner than lobotomy, even though it was known to be capable of causing severe sedation. The underlying neurochemistry involved has since been studied in detail, and subsequent antipsychotic drugs have been developed by rational drug design.

The discovery of chlorpromazine's psychoactive effects in 1952 led to further research that resulted in the development of antidepressants, anxiolytics, and the majority of other drugs now used in the management of psychiatric conditions. In 1952, Henri Laborit described chlorpromazine only as inducing indifference towards what was happening around them in nonpsychotic, nonmanic patients, and Jean Delay and Pierre Deniker described it as controlling manic or psychotic agitation. The former claimed to have discovered a treatment for agitation in anyone, and the latter team claimed to have discovered a treatment for psychotic illness.

Until the 1970s there was considerable debate within psychiatry on the most appropriate term to use to describe the new drugs. In the late 1950s the most widely used term was "neuroleptic", followed by "major tranquilizer" and then "ataraxic". The first recorded use of the term tranquilizer dates from the early nineteenth century. In 1953 Frederik F. Yonkman, a chemist at the Swiss-based Cibapharmaceutical company, first used the term tranquilizer to differentiate reserpine from the older sedatives. The word neuroleptic was coined in 1955 by Delay and Deniker after their discovery (1952) of the antipsychotic effects of chlorpromazine. Thus, the word means taking hold of one's nerves. It was often taken to refer also to common side effects such as reduced activity in general, as well as lethargy and impaired motor control. Although these effects are unpleasant and in some cases harmful, they were at one time, along with akathisia, considered a reliable sign that the drug was working. The term "ataraxy" was coined by the neurologist Howard Fabing and the classicist Alister Cameron to describe the observed effect of psychic indifference and detachment in patients treated with chlorpromazine. This term derived from the Greek adjective "ἀτάρακτος" (ataraktos), which means "not disturbed, not excited, without confusion, steady, calm". In the use of the terms "tranquilizer" and "ataractic", medical practitioners distinguished between the "major tranquilizers" or "major ataractics", which referred to drugs used to treat psychoses, and the "minor tranquilizers" or "minor ataractics", which referred to drugs used to treat neuroses. While popular during the 1950s, these terms are infrequently used today. They are being abandoned in favor of "antipsychotic", which refers to the drug's desired effects. Today, "minor tranquilizer" can refer to anxiolytic and/or hypnotic drugs such as the benzodiazepines and nonbenzodiazepines, which are useful as generally short-term management for insomnia together with cognitive behavioral therapy for insomnia. They are potentially addictive sedatives.

Antipsychotics are broadly divided into two groups, the typical or first-generation antipsychotics and the atypical or second-generation antipsychotics. The difference between first- and second-generation antipsychotics is a subject of debate. The second-generation antipsychotics are generally distinguishable by the presence of 5HT2A receptor antagonism and a corresponding lower propensity for extrapyramidal side effects compared to first-generation antipsychotics.

Society and culture

Terminology
The term major tranquilizer was used for older antipsychotic drugs. The term neuroleptic is often used as a synonym for antipsychotic, even though – strictly speaking – the two terms are not interchangeable. Antipsychotic drugs are a subgroup of neuroleptic drugs, because the latter have a wider range of effects.

Antipsychotics are a type of psychoactive or psychotropic medication.

Sales
Antipsychotics were once among the biggest selling and most profitable of all drugs, generating $22 billion in global sales in 2008. By 2003 in the US, an estimated 3.21 million patients received antipsychotics, worth an estimated $2.82 billion. Over 2/3 of prescriptions were for the newer, more expensive atypicals, each costing on average $164 per year, compared to $40 for the older types. By 2008, sales in the US reached $14.6 billion, the biggest selling drugs in the US by therapeutic class.

In the five years since July 2017 the number of antipsychotic medicines dispensed in the community in the United Kingdom has increased by 11.2%.  There have also been substantial price rises.   Risperidone 6 mg tablets, the largest, increased from £3.09 in July 2017 to £41.16 in June 2022.  The NHS is spending an additional £33 million annually on antipsychotics. Haloperidol 500 microgram tablets constituted £14.3 million of this.

Overprescription 
Antipsychotics in the nursing home population are often overprescribed, often for the purposes of making it easier to handle dementia patients. Federal efforts to reduce the use of antipsychotics in US nursing homes has led to a nationwide decrease in their usage in 2012.

Legal
Antipsychotics are sometimes administered as part of compulsory psychiatric treatment via inpatient (hospital) commitment or outpatient commitment.

Formulations
They may be administered orally or, in some cases, through long-acting (depot) injections administered in the dorsgluteal, ventrogluteal or deltoid muscle. Short-acting parenteral formulations also exist, which are generally reserved for emergencies or when oral administration is otherwise impossible. The oral formulations include immediate release, extended release, and orally disintegrating products (which are not sublingual, and can help ensure that medications are swallowed instead of "cheeked"). Sublingual products (e.g. asenapine) also exist, which must be held under the tongue for absorption. The first transdermal formulation of an antipsychotic (transdermal asenapine, marketed as Secuado), was FDA-approved in 2019.

Recreational use
Certain second-generation antipsychotics are misused or abused for their sedative, tranquilizing, and (paradoxically) "hallucinogenic" effects. The most commonly second-generation antipsychotic implicated is quetiapine. In case reports, quetiapine has been abused in doses taken by mouth (which is how the drug is available from the manufacturer), but also crushed and insufflated or mixed with water for injection into a vein. Olanzapine, another sedating second-generation antipsychotic, has also been misused for similar reasons. There is no standard treatment for antipsychotic abuse, though switching to a second-generation antipsychotic with less abuse potential (e.g. aripiprazole) has been used.

Controversy
Joanna Moncrieff has argued that antipsychotic drug treatment is often undertaken as a means of control rather than to treat specific symptoms experienced by the patient.

Use of this class of drugs has a history of criticism in residential care. As the drugs used can make patients calmer and more compliant, critics claim that the drugs can be overused. Outside doctors can feel under pressure from care home staff. In an official review commissioned by UK government ministers it was reported that the needless use of antipsychotic medication in dementia care was widespread and was linked to 1800 deaths per year. In the US, the government has initiated legal action against the pharmaceutical company Johnson & Johnson for allegedly paying kickbacks to Omnicare to promote its antipsychotic risperidone (Risperdal) in nursing homes.

There has also been controversy about the role of pharmaceutical companies in marketing and promoting antipsychotics, including allegations of downplaying or covering up adverse effects, expanding the number of conditions or illegally promoting off-label usage; influencing drug trials (or their publication) to try to show that the expensive and profitable newer atypicals were superior to the older cheaper typicals that were out of patent. Following charges of illegal marketing, settlements by two large pharmaceutical companies in the US set records for the largest criminal fines ever imposed on corporations. One case involved Eli Lilly and Company's antipsychotic Zyprexa, and the other involved Bextra. In the Bextra case, the government also charged Pfizer with illegally marketing another antipsychotic, Geodon. In addition, AstraZeneca faces numerous personal-injury lawsuits from former users of Seroquel (quetiapine), amidst federal investigations of its marketing practices. By expanding the conditions for which they were indicated, Astrazeneca's Seroquel and Eli Lilly's Zyprexa had become the biggest selling antipsychotics in 2008 with global sales of $5.5 billion and $5.4 billion respectively.

Harvard University medical professor Joseph Biederman conducted research on bipolar disorder in children that led to an increase in such diagnoses. A 2008 Senate investigation found that Biederman also received $1.6 million in speaking and consulting fees between 2000 and 2007, some of them undisclosed to Harvard, from companies including makers of antipsychotic drugs prescribed for children with bipolar disorder. Johnson & Johnson gave more than $700,000 to a research center that was headed by Biederman from 2002 to 2005, where research was conducted, in part, on Risperdal, the company's antipsychotic drug. Biederman has responded saying that the money did not influence him and that he did not promote a specific diagnosis or treatment.

Pharmaceutical companies have also been accused of attempting to set the mental health agenda through activities such as funding consumer advocacy groups.

Special populations
It is recommended that persons with dementia who exhibit behavioral and psychological symptoms should not be given antipsychotics before trying other treatments. When taking antipsychotics this population has increased risk of cerebrovascular effects, parkinsonism or extrapyramidal symptoms, sedation, confusion and other cognitive adverse effects, weight gain, and increased mortality. Physicians and caretakers of persons with dementia should try to address symptoms including agitation, aggression, apathy, anxiety, depression, irritability, and psychosis with alternative treatments whenever antipsychotic use can be replaced or reduced. Elderly persons often have their dementia treated first with antipsychotics and this is not the best management strategy.

See also 

 List of investigational antipsychotics
 Antipsychotic switching

Notes

References

Further reading

External links 

 Recommendations for the use of antipsychotics for treating psychosis, World Health Organization 2012
 Are atypical antipsychotics advantageous? – the case for, Australian Prescriber 2005 (note: pharmaceutical company conflict of interest statement at the end)
 Are atypical antipsychotics advantageous? – the case against, Australian Prescriber 2005
 First Generation Antipsychotics: An Introduction, Psychopharmacology Institute, 2012
 FDA Public Health Advisory – Public Health Advisory for Antipsychotic Drugs used for Treatment of Behavioral Disorders in Elderly Patients, fda.gov
 Antipsychotic Medication – information from mental health charity The Royal College of Psychiatrists
  FROTA LH. Fifty Years of Antipsychotic Drugs in Psychiatry. "Cinqüenta Anos de Medicamentos Antipsicóticos em Psiquiatria." 1st ed; Ebook: CD-Rom/On-Line Portuguese, File .pdf (Adobe Acrobat) 6Mb, Informática, Rio de Janeiro, August 2003, 486pp., medicina.ufrj.br

 
Psychiatry controversies
Drug classes defined by psychological effects
Dopamine antagonists